Patton's long-tongued bat (Hsunycteris pattoni) is a bat species from Bolivia, Colombia, Ecuador, and Peru. It was originally described in the genus Lonchophylla, but was moved to Hsunycteris when the latter was erected in 2014.

References

Bats of South America
Hsunycteris
Mammals of Bolivia
Mammals of Colombia
Mammals of Ecuador
Mammals of Peru
Mammals described in 2006